Paiania–Kantza is a station located north east of the suburban town of Paiania in Athens, East Attica. located in the median strip of the Attiki Odos motorway. This station first opened to Athens Suburban Railway trains on 30 July 2004, with Athens Metro services calling at this station from 10 July 2006.

The station's platforms have two levels, with each end serving trains from either the Athens Metro or the Suburban Railway: Suburban Railway trains stop at the southern end. In contrast, Athens Metro Line 3 trains stop at the northern end. , the station is served by two Suburban Railway trains per hour to the airport, one or two to Ano Liosia and one to Pireaus.

Naming

Although the station signs mention the name Paiania-Kantza, all trains' announcements call the station simply Kantza.

Services

Since 27 September 2022, the following weekday services call at this station:

Bus route 307 and 324 call at the bus stop.

Station layout

References

Athens Metro stations
Buildings and structures in East Attica
Railway stations in Attica
Railway stations in highway medians
Railway stations opened in 2004
Transport in East Attica
2004 establishments in Greece